The Chinese crested tern (Thalasseus bernsteini) is a tern in the family Laridae. It is the county bird of Lienchiang County, Fuchien.

Description
It is closely related to the Sandwich tern, T. sandvicensis, and the lesser crested tern, T. bengalensis. It is most similar to the former, differing only in the bill pattern, which is the reverse of the Sandwich tern's, being yellow with a black tip. From the lesser crested tern, which it overlaps in wintering distribution, it can be told by the white rump and paler grey mantle, as well as the black tip to the bill, which seen from up close also has a white point. The larger greater crested tern is also similar, differing in its stouter, all-yellow bill and darker grey mantle and rump, as well as in size.

Distribution and conservation
It is a critically endangered species, and previously thought extinct. Only four pairs were rediscovered in 2000 nesting in a greater crested tern colony on an islet in the Matsu Islands (a territory governed by Taiwan), just off the coast of Fujian Province, China, and wintering south to the Philippines. In the past, it had a wider distribution of the Chinese east coast north to Shandong Province. The decline is thought to be due to past hunting and egg collection for food. This colony may have been protected due to the islands' disputed status (administered by the Taiwanese government but claimed by mainland China), and the military sensitivity of the area, which has restricted access. The islet has now been declared a wildlife sanctuary. It is possible that other small colonies may yet be found off the Chinese and Taiwanese coasts; migrant birds have been seen near the mouth of the Pachang River in southern Taiwan. The total population is speculated to be less than 50 birds.

In 2007 it was estimated that the Chinese crested tern would be extinct in five years if authorities would not protect it. BirdLife International of Cambridge, England, stated that a survey of Chinese experts found that the number of crested terns fell to 50 birds, half the population of 2004. A Chinese survey team led by Chen Shuihua stated that the bird was "on the verge of extinction."

It is currently threatened by illegal egg collection, typhoons, and disturbance of nesting colonies by fishermen. There is also a threat of hybridization with the greater crested tern. 

In 2016, for the first time, Chinese crested terns were found breeding in South Korea. Setting up a new colony in such a faraway area would prove a boon for the species.

References

 Bridge, E. S.; Jones, A. W. & Baker, A. J. (2005): A phylogenetic framework for the terns (Sternini) inferred from mtDNA sequences: implications for taxonomy and plumage evolution. Molecular Phylogenetics and Evolution 35: 459–469. PDF fulltext

External links 
 BirdLife Species Factsheet. 
 Matsu Islands information
 Oriental Bird Club - rediscovery of Chinese Crested Tern (with photo)
 Taiwan Fauna (with photo)
 

Thalasseus
Birds described in 1863
Critically endangered fauna of China